Technocrane is a telescopic camera crane widely utilised in the film industry and in television production worldwide. 

The camera is mounted on the remote head on the end of the crane and is remote controlled by a camera operator at a control desk. The  Technocrane can telescope at variable speeds of up to 2.5m/s on demand. It allows camera moves that cannot be achieved using a jib arm or a camera dolly, and the telescoping can be used to compensate for the camera moving in an arc called "arc compensation".

History 
Originally commissioned, manufactured, named and marketed by Technovision Ltd. in London, United Kingdom, the first TechnoCrane was exhibited by Technovision during Photokina Expo in Cologne, Germany in September 1986.

The first Technocrane related U.S. Patent #4943019 was granted to Gyula Mester/Technovision and filed in 1988 by the US Patent Office. 

The Technocrane was first introduced to Hollywood in the late 1980s by one of the Technovision trained crane technicians, Simon Jayes.

In 1999, the Society of Camera Operators (S.O.C.) presented their technical achievement award to Technovision, Gyula Mester and Keith Edwards for the "First Telescopic Camera Crane" and for their significant contributions to the Art, Craft and Safety of the Camera Operator.
 
In 2005, at the 77th annual ceremony the Academy of Motion Picture Arts and Sciences presented Academy Awards to Horst Burbulla, Gyula Mester and Keith Edwards for the invention and development of the Technocrane.

Usage 
Productions that have used the Technocrane or the later SuperTechnocrane include Titanic, the Harry Potter films, the Lord of the Rings films, and all the James Bond films of the late 1990s and 2000s, among many others.

Gallery

See also
 Crane shot

References

External links
 1st Technocrane related Patent - 1988 - by [Gyula Mester / Technovision]
 Maker of MovieBird telescopic cranes
 Maker of SuperTechno 
 Maker of the Scorpio cranes

Products introduced in 1986
British inventions
Film and video technology
Cranes (machines)